Mark Schroeder may refer to:

 Mark Schroeder (philosopher), American philosopher
 Mark G. Schroeder, president of the Wisconsin Evangelical Lutheran Synod
 Mark J. F. Schroeder (born 1955), American politician